Dụng Quang Nho (born 1 January 2000) is a Vietnamese professional footballer of Cham ethnicity who plays as a midfielder for V.League 1 club Hoàng Anh Gia Lai.

International goals

U-19

U-23

Honours
Vietnam U-23
 AFF U-23 Championship: 2022
Southeast Asian Games: 2021

References

External links

2000 births
Living people
Vietnamese footballers
V.League 1 players
Hoang Anh Gia Lai FC players
Haiphong FC players
People from Bình Thuận Province
Vietnam international footballers
Association football midfielders
Competitors at the 2021 Southeast Asian Games
Southeast Asian Games competitors for Vietnam
Vietnamese Cham people